Richard Broadus Culler (January 15, 1915 – June 16, 1964), known outside of professional baseball by his middle name, was an American pro baseball player who appeared in 472 Major League games (primarily as a shortstop) for the Philadelphia Athletics (1936), Chicago White Sox (1943), Boston Braves (1944–47), Chicago Cubs (1948) and New York Giants (1949).

In eight MLB seasons he played in 472 games and totalled 1,527 at-bats, 195 runs, 372 hits, 39 doubles, 6 triples, 2 home runs, 99 RBI, 19 stolen bases, 166 walks with a .244 batting average, a .320 on-base percentage and a .281 slugging percentage.

Culler attended High Point College, where he played baseball, basketball and soccer. He was best known for his exploits as captain of the basketball team and his No. 9 was the first ever retired at the school. He was player and coach of the soccer team, and was a pitcher and infielder for the baseball team.

Culler also played in the independent Carolina League for several seasons with the Concord Weavers.

After his playing career, Culler founded and operated the Autographed Baseball Company, which still exists in High Point today.

Culler died in Chapel Hill, North Carolina at the age of 49.

References

External links

1915 births
1964 deaths
Baltimore Orioles (IL) players
Baseball players from North Carolina
Boston Braves players
Chicago Cubs players
Chicago White Sox players
High Point Panthers baseball players
High Point Panthers men's basketball players
Jersey City Giants players
Major League Baseball shortstops
Milwaukee Brewers (minor league) players
Minneapolis Millers (baseball) players
Nashville Vols players
New York Giants (NL) players
Sportspeople from High Point, North Carolina
Philadelphia Athletics players
Reidsville Luckies players
St. Paul Saints (AA) players
American men's basketball players